Benjamin House may refer to:

Ruben M. Benjamin House, Bloomington, IL, listed on the NRHP in Illinois
Benjamin House (Shelbina, Missouri), listed on the NRHP in Missouri
Belcher-Ogden Mansion-Price, Benjamin-Price-Brittan Houses District, Elizabeth, NJ, listed on the NRHP in New Jersey
James Benjamin Homestead, Flanders, NY, listed on the NRHP in New York